Scaevola socotraensis is a species of flowering plant in the family Goodeniaceae. It is endemic to Socotra off the coast of mainland Yemen. There are just a few individuals of this critically endangered plant growing at freshwater seeps on the island. Changes in the hydrology of the local ecosystem caused by development are a threat.

References

Endemic flora of Socotra
socotraensis
Endangered plants
Taxonomy articles created by Polbot